This article lists the winners and nominees for the Billboard Music Award for Top Billboard 200 Artist: The award was first given out during the 1992 ceremony, but was retired the following year. The award returned in 2011 and since its conception.
American singer-songwriter Taylor Swift has the most wins in this category with five, Swift is also the most nominations artist with eight.

Winners and nominees

1990s

2010s

2020s

Multiple wins and nominations

Wins

Nominations

8 nominations
 Taylor Swift

7 nominations
 Drake

4 nominations
 Adele
 Justin Bieber

3 nominations
 One Direction
 Post Malone

2 nominations
 Beyoncé
 Eminem
 Juice WRLD
 The Weeknd

References

Billboard awards